Verbatim is the fifth studio album by Bob Ostertag, released in May 1996 by Rastascan Records.

Reception

Dean McFarlane of AllMusic gave the Verbatim three out of five possible stars, saying "the work is a vital and highly experimental composition that challenges the concepts of improvisation and composition."

Track listing

Personnel
Adapted from the Verbatim liner notes.

Musicians
 Bob Ostertag – Ensoniq ASR-10 sampler, Emagic's Logic Audio And Macromedia's Deck II

Additional musicians
 Mark Dresser – contrabass
 Phil Minton – vocals
 Gerry Hemingway – percussion

Production and design
 D-L Alvarez – cover art, design

Release history

References

External links 
 Verbatim at Bandcamp
 

1996 albums
Bob Ostertag albums